This gallery of sovereign state flags shows the national or state flags of sovereign states that appear on the list of sovereign states. For other flags, please see flags of active autonomist and secessionist movements, flags of extinct states and gallery of flags of dependent territories. Each flag is depicted as if the flagpole is positioned on the left of the flag, except for those of the Islamic Emirate of Afghanistan, Iran, Iraq, and Saudi Arabia, which are depicted with the hoist to the right.



A

B

C

D

E

F

G

H

I

J

K

L

M

N

O

P

Q

R

S

T

U

V

Y

Z

Other states

See also

List of national flags by design
Timeline of national flags
List of aspect ratios of national flags
Armorial of sovereign states
Gallery of flags of dependent territories
Flags of country subdivisions
Lists of city flags
Flags of micronations
Flags of ethnic groups
Flags of active autonomist and secessionist movements
Flags of formerly independent states

 
flag